Ptycholepis is an extinct genus of prehistoric ray-finned fish having the head and opercular bones ornamented with ridges of ganoin, minute teeth, and thick scales (which are much longer than deep and are grooved longitudinally on the outer side).

Ptycholepis belongs to the family Ptycholepidae (= Boreosomidae/Chungkingichthyidae). Other genera of this family are Acrorhabdus (Spitsbergen, Early Triassic), Ardoreosomus (Nevada, United States; Early Triassic), Boreosomus (global, Early Triassic), Chungkingichthys (China, Early Triassic) and Yuchoulepis (China, Early Triassic). A typical feature of this family is the dorsal fin, which inserts at the level of the pelvic fins in the front part of the body. Other characters include the striated skull bones and scales, and the small teeth.

See also

 Prehistoric fish
 List of prehistoric bony fish

References

 Paleobiology Database entry

Prehistoric ray-finned fish genera